A funeral is a ceremony marking a person's death.

Funeral may also refer to:

Films and television
 The Funeral (1984 film), a film by Juzo Itami
 The Funeral (1996 film), a film by Abel Ferrara
 "The Funeral" (Brooklyn Nine-Nine), a television episode
 "Funeral" (Glee), a television episode
 "The Funeral", an episode of One Day at a Time (2017 TV series)

Music
 Funeral (band), a Norwegian doom metal band
 Funeral (Arcade Fire album), a 2004 album by Arcade Fire
 Funeral (Lil Wayne album), a 2020 album by Lil Wayne
 "Funeral" (Phoebe Bridgers song), 2017
 "The Funeral" (Band of Horses song), 2006
 "The Funeral" (Hank Williams song), 1950
 "The Funeral" (Yungblud song), 2022
 "Funeral", a song on Iced Earth's 1990 album Iced Earth
 "Funeral", a song on The Mekon's 1991 album The Curse of the Mekons
 "Funeral", a song on Devin Townsend's 1997 album Ocean Machine: Biomech
 "Funeral", a song on Lukas Graham's 2015 album Lukas Graham
 "Funeral", a song on Phoebe Bridgers' 2017 album Stranger in the Alps
 "Funeral", a song on Zara Larsson's 2017 album So Good "The Funeral", a song on The Staple Singers 1965 album Freedom Highway
 "The Funeral", a song on Staind's 1996 album TormentedLiterature
 "The Funeral", a 1939 short story by William March in the Some Like Them Short collection
 "The Funeral", a 1972 short story by Kate Wilhelm in the Again, Dangerous Visions'' anthology

Other uses
 The Funeral (painting), an 1867–1870 painting by Édouard Manet
 The Funeral (Grosz), a 1917–1918 painting by George Grosz

See also
 Funeral Games (disambiguation)
 Funeral party (disambiguation)
 Funeral Song (disambiguation)